Homeyran (also Romanized as Ḩomeyrān; also known as ’ameyrān, ’amīrān, ’amīrān-e Gāvbandī, Hamiran Gavbandi, Hamīru, and ’omeyrān) is a village in Buchir Rural District, in the Central District of Parsian County, Hormozgan Province, Iran. At the 2006 census, its population was 814, in 169 families.

References 

Populated places in Parsian County